F.W. Schröder-Schrom (31 May 1879 – 10 May 1956) was a German actor who appeared in more than a hundred films between 1920 and 1955 including the military comedy-drama Shoulder Arms (1939).

Selected filmography
 The Monastery's Hunter (1920)
 Eternal River (1920)
 Black Monday (1922)
 Rosenmontag (1924)
 Father Voss (1925)
 Cock of the Roost (1925)
 Don Juan in a Girls' School (1928)
 Eight Girls in a Boat (1932)
 Trenck (1932)
 The Invisible Front (1932)
 The First Right of the Child (1932)
 Marshal Forwards (1932)
 The Burning Secret (1933)
 Dream of the Rhine (1933)
 A Thousand for One Night (1933)
 The Roberts Case (1933)
 Girls of Today (1933)
 A Precocious Girl (1934)
 The Prodigal Son (1934)
 Forget Me Not (1935)
 A Night of Change (1935)
 Artist Love (1935)
 The Saint and Her Fool (1935)
 Tomfoolery (1936)
 Family Parade (1936)
 Stronger Than Regulations (1936)
The Unknown (1936)
 Togger (1937)
 Crooks in Tails (1937)
 Seven Slaps (1937)
 Tango Notturno (1937)
 The Man Who Was Sherlock Holmes (1937)
 Anna Favetti (1938)
 The Impossible Mister Pitt (1938)
 Red Orchids (1938)
 By a Silken Thread (1938)
 Police Report (1939)
 Who's Kissing Madeleine? (1939)
 The Governor (1939)
 Robert and Bertram (1939)
 Shoulder Arms (1939)
 Passion (1940)
 Alarm (1941)
 The Endless Road (1943)
 The Noltenius Brothers (1945)
 Via Mala (1945)
 Rumpelstiltskin (1955)

References

Bibliography 
 Richards, Jeffrey. Visions of Yesterday. Routledge & Kegan Paul, 1973.

External links 
 

1879 births
1956 deaths
German male film actors
German male silent film actors
Actors from Frankfurt
20th-century German male actors